Piranha is a horror comedy film series that consists of five films. The original film is a parody of the 1975 film Jaws.

Films

Piranha (1978)
Piranha is a 1978 American horror B movie about a swarm of killer piranhas. It was directed and co-edited by Joe Dante and starred Bradford Dillman, Heather Menzies, Kevin McCarthy, Keenan Wynn, Barbara Steele, and Dick Miller. Produced by Roger Corman, Piranha was inspired by the 1975 film Jaws, which had been a major success for distributor Universal Studios and director Steven Spielberg.  It has since inspired a series of similarly themed B movies such as Grizzly.

The film involves a private investigator Maggie McNamara from Lyon Investigation.  She was hired by the wealthy J.R. Randolph to find his niece, who  disappeared with her boyfriend. Maggie seeks out the lonely environmentalist Paul Grogan to help her to look for the teenager. They head to an abandoned army facility and Maggie decides to drain the pools to see if the body of the girl is one of them. They are assaulted by a man with a crowbar, but they subdue him. However, he escapes, and soon they learn that the man is Dr. Robert Hoak, who, for military purposes, is researching a hybrid species of piranha that is capable of surviving in fresh and sea waters. Furthermore, Maggie has released the piranhas in the river, and they are heading to the Lost River Lake Resort.

Piranha II: The Spawning (1982)
Piranha II: The Spawning, also known as Piranha II: Flying Killers, is a 1982 horror film and the sequel to the 1978 low-budget cult film Piranha.   The film is the feature film directorial debut of James Cameron.

Piranha (1995)
Piranha, also known as Piranhas, is a 1995 American horror film directed by Scott P. Levy about a school of killer piranhas descending upon the bustling Lost River Lake Resort. Produced as part of Roger Corman Presents, a series of TV films by Roger Corman for Showtime, it is a remake of the 1978 film Piranha.

Piranha 3D (2010)
Piranha 3D is a 2010 American 3D horror comedy film and a remake of the 1978 film Piranha. It was directed by Alexandre Aja and sports an ensemble cast featuring Steven R. McQueen, Jessica Szohr, Jerry O'Connell, Richard Dreyfuss, Christopher Lloyd, Elisabeth Shue, Adam Scott, Kelly Brook, Riley Steele, Ving Rhames and Eli Roth. The film begins with a sudden underwater tremor that frees scores of the prehistoric man-eating fish. An unlikely group of strangers must band together to stop themselves from becoming fish food for the area's new razor-toothed residents.

Piranha 3DD (2012)
Piranha 3DD is a 2012 American 3D comedy horror film and sequel to the 2010 film Piranha 3D. It is directed by John Gulager from a screenplay by Marcus Dunstan and Patrick Melton. It stars Danielle Panabaker, Matt Bush, David Koechner, Chris Zylka, Katrina Bowden, Gary Busey, Christopher Lloyd, and David Hasselhoff. Production began on April 27, 2011 with a release scheduled for November 23, 2011, but a month prior to release this date was revised to an unspecified 2012 date. The film was eventually released in the UK on May 11, 2012 and in the U.S. on June 1, 2012.

Cast and crew

Cast

Crew

References

Horror film series
Comedy film series
Parodies of horror